The Women's road race of the 2021 UCI Road World Championships was a cycling event that took place on 25 September 2021 from Antwerp to Leuven, Belgium. Anna van der Breggen of the Netherlands was the defending champion.

The race was won by Italian Elisa Balsamo in a bunch sprint ahead of three time world champion Marianne Vos from the Netherlands, and Katarzyna Niewiadoma from Poland.

Qualification
Qualification was based mainly on the UCI World Ranking by nations as of 17 August 2021.

UCI World Rankings
The following nations qualified.

Continental champions

Final classification

References

Women's road race
UCI Road World Championships – Women's road race
2021 in women's road cycling